Mieczysław Władysław Omyła (born 1941) is a Polish professor of humanities, logician, philosopher. He is a lecturer in logic and philosophy at the Cardinal Stefan Wyszyński University in Warsaw.

Education and career

Biography 
He comes from Soblówka. He was a student of Roman Suszko and an associate of Bogusław Wolniewicz. 

He continued Suszko's logical and ontological works, often referring to Wolniewicz's ontology of the situation. In 1991 he became the Head of the Logic Department at the Institute of Philosophy of the University of Warsaw. In 1997 he obtained the academic title of professor of humanities. He was a member of the Polish Semiotic Society and the Polish Academy of Sciences.

Janusz Wesserling obtained a PhD degree under his supervision, .

Selected works 
 Paradygmat fregowski a teorie sytuacji (2009)
 Remarks on Non-Fregean Logic (2007)
 Homomorfizm semantyczny a reifikacja sytuacji (2006)
 Aksjomat Fregego a ekstensjonalność (2005)

References 

1941 births
Academic staff of Cardinal Stefan Wyszyński University in Warsaw
Academic staff of the University of Warsaw
Academic staff of the Polish Academy of Sciences
People from Żywiec County
Living people
21st-century Polish philosophers